Two vessels of the Royal Navy have been named HMS Genista, after the flower:

  was an  minesweeping sloop built by Napier & Miller and launched on 26 February 1916. Sunk by German submarine  in the Atlantic on 23 October 1916..
  was a  launched at Harland & Wolff on 24 July 1941.  It was transferred to the Air Ministry in 1947 and renamed Weather Recorder, and broken up in Antwerp in October 1961.

References
 

Royal Navy ship names